National Hugging Day is an annual event dedicated to hugging. It was created by Kevin Zaborney  and occurs annually on January 21.  The day was first celebrated on January 21, 1986, in Clio, Michigan, USA. The holiday is also observed in many other countries.  The idea of National Hug Day is to encourage everyone to hug family and friends more often.  Zaborney cautions to ask first if one is unsure of the response as respecting the personal space of others is always important and some people are not huggers.

History 
Kevin Zaborney is credited with coming up with the idea of National Hugging Day in 1986. It was included in Chase's Calendar of Events; Zaborney's friend at the time was the granddaughter of the proprietors of the publication.  He chose January 21st as it fell between the Christmas, New Year's Holidays, Valentine's Day, and birthdays when he found people are generally in low spirits.  Zaborney considered that "American society is embarrassed to show feelings in public" and hoped that a National Hugging Day would change that, although he thought that his idea would fail.

References

External links

Observances in the United States
1986 introductions
January observances
Unofficial observances